Yining is a city in Xinjiang, China.

Yining may also refer to:

Yining, Jiangxi (义宁镇), town in Xiushui County
Yishan Yining (一山 一寧; 1247–1317), Zen master

Yining City and Yining County are different. Yining is usually called Ghulja, and Yining county is usually called Jlyuz.

See also
Li Yining